Robert Dent Oswald (4 April 1909 – 5 December 1981) was an  Australian rules footballer who played with North Melbourne in the Victorian Football League (VFL).

Family
The son of William Dent Oswald (1890-), and Margaret Ann Oswald (1885-1969), née Carl, Robert Dent Oswald was born at Williamstown, Victoria on 4 April 1909.

He married Elwyn Carnegie Edwards (1912-2006) in 1931. He married Hazel Doreen Webb (1920-1967) in 1944.

Football
He played 5 games for the North Melbourne First XVIII in 1929.

Military service
Oswald served in the Australian Army for two separate periods during World War II.

Death
He died at Altona, Victoria on 5 December 1981.

Notes

References

External links 

1909 births
1981 deaths
Australian rules footballers from Melbourne
North Melbourne Football Club players
People from Williamstown, Victoria
Australian Army personnel of World War II
Military personnel from Melbourne